Cuts Across the Land is the first album by the English indie rock band The Duke Spirit. It was released in the United Kingdom in May 2005. It reached #40 in the UK Albums Chart.

Critical reception
Drowned in Sound called the album "at times sensational, but so often so-near-so-far." The Times called it "that most precious thing: a debut album that triumphantly, emphatically lives up to the promise of the clutch of singles and EPs that preceded it, and the thundering live shows that their charismatic singer, Leila Moss, takes command of so imperiously."

Track listing

Souvenirs 
The 'Special Edition' UK release included a bonus disc of exclusive rarities, titled in the sleeve notes as Souvenirs – A Bonus Album and on the disc itself as Rarities Album. It comprised ten additional tracks, made up of demos and radio sessions.

References

External links
 The Duke Spirit members give details of each song on Cuts Across The Land

2005 albums
The Duke Spirit albums